is a railway station in the town of Nagaizumi, Shizuoka Prefecture, Japan, operated by the Central Japan Railway Company (JR Tōkai).

Lines

Station layout
The station has a single island platform. The station building is to the east of tracks and connected to the platform with a footbridge. It has automated ticket machines, TOICA automated turnstiles, and a staffed ticket office.

Platforms

History
The station first opened on June 15, 1898 as Mishima Station on the original route of the Tōkaidō Main Line under the Japanese Government Railways. JGR became the Japanese National Railways (JNR) from 1946. Regularly scheduled freight operations were suspended from 1982. Along with privatization and division of JNR, JR Central started operating the station from April 1, 1987.

Station numbering was introduced to the Gotemba Line in March 2018; Shimo-Togari Station was assigned station number CB16.

Passenger statistics
In fiscal 2017, the station was used by an average of 1354 passengers daily (boarding passengers only).

Surrounding area
Ayutsubo Falls
Numazu Technical High School

See also
 List of Railway Stations in Japan

References

External links

 Official website 

Railway stations in Japan opened in 1898
Railway stations in Shizuoka Prefecture
Gotemba Line
Stations of Central Japan Railway Company
Nagaizumi, Shizuoka